Left Unity was a communist political group with seats in the European Parliament between 1989 and 1994.

History
Left Unity was founded on 25 July 1989 with 14 members. It included MEPs from the French Communist Party, Communist Party of Greece and Portuguese Communist Party and the Irish Workers' Party. These parties were generally hostile to Eurocommunism and were influenced by Moscow. After the 1994 elections it became the "Confederal Group of the European United Left" on 19 July 1994.

Sources
Development of Political Groups in the European Parliament
Europe Politique
Democracy in the European Parliament
European Parliament MEP Archives

References

Former European Parliament party groups
Communist parties in Europe